David Johan Kvandal (né Johansen; 8 September 1919 – 16 February 1999) was a Norwegian composer.

Career
He was born in Kristiania to David Monrad Johansen and Amunda Holmsen, with the family later moving to Bærum where Kvandal died.

He took his studies in conducting and organ at Oslo Conservatory, and studied composition from Marx at the Hochschule für Musik, Vienna, and Boulanger in Paris. He served as a music critic for the Oslo newspapers Morgenposten and Aftenposten, and as organist of the Vålenengen Church in Oslo. Many of his works utilize folk elements. His opera , with libretto based on Hamsun's novel, was staged at Den Norske Opera in 1994.

He was married twice, first to Maria Teresia Unterrainer (from 1951), and from 1976 to Lilleba Lund.

References

1919 births
1999 deaths
20th-century classical composers
20th-century Norwegian male musicians
Musicians from Bærum
Artists from Oslo
Norwegian classical composers
Norwegian contemporary classical composers
Norwegian male classical composers